This article contains information about the literary events and publications of 2021.

Events 
January 1 – British writer and illustrator Anthony Browne is appointed a Commander of the Order of the British Empire (CBE) in the 2021 New Year Honours for services to literature.
September 7 – A Radio-Canada article reveals that 5,000 books from 30 French-language school libraries in Southwestern Ontario were destroyed by the Conseil scolaire catholique Providence because they included racial stereotypes relating to Indigenous peoples of the Americas. Although intended as a "gesture of reconciliation", the action meets with widespread condemnation.
October 6 – The National Assembly of France adopts new legislation mandating a minimum price on book deliveries to protect independent bookstores from e-commerce giants including Amazon and Fnac, who have circumvented a 2014 law banning the free delivery of books by offering discounted shipping at €0.01.

New books

Fiction

Children and young adults

Poetry

Drama 
Giles Terera – The Meaning of Zong

Non-fiction

Biography and memoirs 

 The Family Roe: An American Story, Joshua Prager, September 14, 2021

Deaths

Awards

See also

References 

 
2021-related lists
Literature
Culture-related timelines by year
Years of the 21st century in literature